Ernest Raymond Zalejski (November 23, 1925 – August 5, 2012) was an American football back who played one season with the Baltimore Colts of the National Football League (NFL). He was drafted by the Chicago Bears in the fifth round of the 1950 NFL Draft. He played college football at the University of Notre Dame and attended Washington High School in South Bend, Indiana.

Early years
Zalejski played high school football at Washington High School all-state honors three times from 1942 to 1944. He was named Most Valuable Player of the North Indiana Conference in 1944. He also won two state championships in 1943 and 1944.

Military career
Zalejski joined the United States Army after graduating from high school in 1945. He served in the Philippines and was in the U.S. occupation force in Japan. He was then shortly stationed in Seattle before being discharged and enrolling at the University of Notre Dame.

College career
Zalejski played for the Notre Dame Fighting Irish from 1946 to 1949. The Fighting Irish won 39 games and were undefeated during his time there. They were also national champions in 1946, 1947 and 1949. Zalejski was named to the Blue Gray All Star Game in 1949.

Professional career
Zalejski was selected by the Chicago Bears of the NFL with the 62nd pick in the 1950 NFL Draft. He played in eleven games for the NFL's Baltimore Colts during the 1950 season.

Coaching career
Zalejski served as head coach at Joliet Catholic High School from 1954 to 1958, accumulating a record of 24-13-4. He retired from coaching in 1959.

Personal life
Zalejski was inducted into the Indiana Football Hall of Fame in 1984 and the South Bend Hall of Fame in 2004. He was also area manager of the U.S. Saving Bonds Division of the U.S. Treasury Department.

References

External links
Just Sports Stats
College stats

1925 births
2012 deaths
Players of American football from South Bend, Indiana
American football defensive backs
American football halfbacks
Notre Dame Fighting Irish football players
Baltimore Colts (1947–1950) players
High school football coaches in Illinois
United States Army personnel of World War II